The Men's Discus Throw F12/11 had its Final held on September 13 at 9:20.

Medalists

Results

References
Final

Athletics at the 2008 Summer Paralympics